The 1946 California gubernatorial election was held on November 5, 1946.

It is notable for the incumbent Governor, Earl Warren, being nominated by both the Republican and Democratic parties, as well as the Progressive Party. Subsequently, Warren won re-election effectively unopposed, receiving more than 90% of the vote. He was the first Governor of the state to win two elections since Hiram Johnson in 1914.

Primaries

Republican primary
The Republican primary occurred on June 5, 1946. Incumbent Governor Earl Warren won 91.10% of the vote.

Democratic primary
The Democratic primary occurred on June 5, 1946. Despite being a Republican, Earl Warren won 51.93% of the vote and won the Democratic nomination.

General election results

References

1946
Gubernatorial
California
November 1946 events in the United States